Line 3 of Zhengzhou Metro is a rapid transit line in Zhengzhou that runs in a northwest - southeast direction. The line uses six car Type A trains. The line opened on December 26, 2020.

Opening timeline

Stations

Phase I

Phase II
Opening in 2023.

References

Zhengzhou Metro lines
Railway lines opened in 2020
2020 establishments in China